Sunset station or Sunset Station may refer to:

Transportation
 17th Street/Santa Monica College station, a light rail station in Los Angeles County, California, formerly named "Sunset"
 Judah and Sunset station, a streetcar stop in San Francisco, California
 San Antonio station (Texas), a railway station that was also known as the "Sunset Station"
 Sunset station (New York), a former rapid transit station in Rochester, New York
 Sunset Transit Center, an intermodal station in Washington County, Oregon
 Taraval and Sunset station, a streetcar stop in San Francisco, California
 Vermont/Sunset station, a subway station in Los Angeles, California

Other uses
Sunset Station (hotel and casino), in Henderson, Nevada, USA
Sunset 102, a radio station in Manchester, England, UK

See also
 Sunset (disambiguation)